The Brown Shoe Company Factory is a historic factory located at 212 S. State St. in Litchfield, Illinois. The factory opened in 1917 to produce shoes for the St. Louis-based Brown Shoe Company. Prominent St. Louis architect Albert B. Groves designed the factory, which was one of twelve he designed for the company. The factory became Litchfield's second-largest industry and brought the community prosperity through the Great Depression; in addition, its employees formed a civic organization that created a public park on company property. The factory closed in 1967; it was later used by cabinet manufacturer Adenca.

The factory was added to the National Register of Historic Places on November 15, 2006.

References

External links
Illinois.gov - Illinois Government News Network (IGNN)
 Historical Society of Montgomery County

National Register of Historic Places in Montgomery County, Illinois
Litchfield, Illinois
Shoe factories
Industrial buildings and structures on the National Register of Historic Places in Illinois
Caleres
1917 establishments in Illinois
Industrial buildings completed in 1917